Martin Gaziev (born 13 August 1988 in Gotse Delchev) is a Bulgarian footballer who plays as a midfielder for Maritsa Plovdiv.

Career
Gaziev played youth football at Lokomotiv 101 in Sofia five years before being scouted by Lokomotiv Plovdiv. He joined Lokomotiv Plovdiv as a youth player at the age of 16.

Gaziev started his senior career at Brestnik 1948 and played also for Benkovski Pazardzhik and Lokomotiv Septemvri, before moving to Pirin Gotse Delchev on 20 June 2011.

After playing six months at Pirin, Gaziev signed for First Macedonian League club Rabotnički Skopje on 1 February 2012.

On 11 July 2017, Gaziev returned to Pirin Razlog.

On 7 January 2018, Gaziev signed with Sozopol.  He left the club at the end of the 2017–18 season.

References

External links
Profile at lpfc.net

Living people
1988 births
People from Gotse Delchev
Bulgarian footballers
Association football midfielders
PFC Pirin Gotse Delchev players
FK Rabotnički players
FC Pirin Razlog players
FC Sozopol players
FC Maritsa Plovdiv players
First Professional Football League (Bulgaria) players
Second Professional Football League (Bulgaria) players
Macedonian First Football League players
Bulgarian expatriate footballers
Expatriate footballers in North Macedonia
Sportspeople from Blagoevgrad Province